Acrodonta are a subclade of iguanian squamates consisting almost entirely of Old World taxa. Extant representation include the families Chamaeleonidae (chameleons) and Agamidae (dragon lizards), with at least over 500 species described.  A fossil genus, Gueragama, was found in Brazil, making it the only known American representative of the group.

The group is eponymously named from their acrodont dentition, whereby the teeth are consolidated with the summit of the alveolar ridge of the jaw without sockets. There are, however, other animals that have acrodont dentition such as tuataras.

Systematics
Usually acrodonts are divided into two families Chamaeleonidae and Agamidae, there are a few studies that suggest chameleons are nested within Agamidae. In order to maintain the familial status of Chamaeleonidae some authors suggested placing the clades Uromastycinae and Leiolepidinae in a third family Leiolepididae. However a majority of papers concerning acrodont phylogenetics support the traditional dichotomy of the group.

Below is the phylogeny of the acrodont lineages after Pyron et al. (2013):

References

Iguanomorpha